The Belleview Bulldogs were a wood bat collegiate summer baseball league team located in Ocala, Florida.  The team was a member of the Florida Collegiate Summer League (FCSL) and played its home games at the Ocala Rotary Sportsplex.  The team joined the FCSL in the 2008 season.  The franchise was disbanded following its inaugural 2008 season.

History
The Bulldogs joined the FCSL in 2008 as an expansion team, one of three franchises joining the league that year.  This brought the total number of FCSL franchises to six.  In their inaugural season, the Bulldogs reached the FCSL championship game at Tropicana Field.  However, they were defeated by the Clermont Mavericks 9-1.

Playoff Appearances

References

External links
 FCSL website

Amateur baseball teams in Florida
Baseball teams established in 2008
2008 establishments in Florida
Defunct baseball teams in Florida
2008 disestablishments in Florida
Baseball teams disestablished in 2008
Ocala, Florida